Sedlec-Prčice is a town in Příbram District in the Central Bohemian Region of the Czech Republic. It has about 2,900 inhabitants. The historical centres of Sedlec and Prčice are well preserved and are protected by law as one urban monument zone.

Administrative parts
Sedlec-Prčice is made up of town parts of Sedlec and Prčice, and 34 villages and hamlets: 

Bolechovice
Bolešín
Božetín
Chotětice
Divišovice
Dvorce
Jetřichovice
Kvasejovice
Kvašťov
Lidkovice
Malkovice
Matějov
Měšetice
Monín
Moninec
Mrákotice
Myslkov
Náhlík
Násilov
Nové Dvory
Přestavlky
Rohov
Staré Mitrovice
Šanovice
Stuchanov
Sušetice
Uhřice
Včelákova Lhota
Veletín
Víska
Vozerovice
Vrchotice
Záběhlice
Záhoří a Kozinec

Geography
It lies in the Vlašim Uplands. The territory of Sedlec-Prčice is rich is small watercourses and fish ponds.

History
The village of Prčice was first mentioned in written document already in the 11th century. The first fortress in Prčice is documented in 1179. The first written mention of Sedlec is from the 14th century. The town was established in 1957 by merging of neighbouring municipalities of Sedlec and Prčice.

Demographics

Sights

The landmark of Sedlec is the parish Church of Saint Jerome. It was a Romanesque church, founded in the 11th or 12th century. In the 14th and 15th centuries it was rebuilt in the Gothic style, and extended. It is the only church in the Czech Republic that is painted in the Art Nouveau style.

The landmark of Prčice is the Church of Saint Lawrence. It was also founded as a Romanesque building in the 11th or 12th century, but was gradually rebuilt. Several Romanesque elements have been preserved to this day. The church is equipped with a valuable organ from 1731 by local native Bedřich Semerád. The church also includes an unused Gothic bell from the early 14th century, which belongs to the oldest bells in Bohemia.

Presence of the Jewish community is commemorated by the old synagogue on the town square that now hosts a small factory that makes sporting equipment. 
 
Located in a field somewhere beyond the town is the old Jewish cemetery, founded in 1867. There are still said to be a small number of gravestones hidden in the overgrowth. The cemetery is owned by the local Jewish community.

Notable people
Witiko of Prčice (c. 1120–1194), nobleman
Joseph Gelinek (1758–1825), Austrian composer and pianist
František Pištěk (1786–1846), Roman Catholic prelate
Adolf Čech (1841–1903), conductor

References

External links

Cities and towns in the Czech Republic
Populated places in Příbram District